To green-light is to give permission to proceed with a project. The term is a reference to the green traffic signal, indicating "go ahead".

Film industry 
In the context of the film and television industries, to green-light something is to formally approve its production finance and to commit to this financing, thereby allowing the project to proceed from the development phase to pre-production and principal photography. The power to green-light a project is generally reserved to those in a project or financial management role within an organization. The process of taking a project from pitch to green light formed the basis of a successful reality TV show titled Project Greenlight.

At the Big Five major film studios in the United States and the mini-majors, green-light power is generally exercised by committees of the studios' high-level executives.  However, the studio president, chairman, or chief executive is usually the person who makes the final judgment call.  For the largest film budgets involving several hundred million U.S. dollars, the chief executive officer or chief operating officer of the studio's parent conglomerate may hold final green-light authority.

References

Film production